Landscape with a Church at Twilight is an oil painting created in 1883 by Vincent van Gogh.

See also
List of works by Vincent van Gogh

References

External links

Paintings by Vincent van Gogh
1883 paintings
Churches in art